Clypeolampadidae is a family of sea urchins belonging to the order Clypeasteroida.

Fossil record
This family is known in Cretaceous the fossil record of France, Oman, Spain and Turkey.

Genera
Genera within this family include: 
 Clypeolampas Pomel, 1869
 Hungaresia Szörényi, 1955

References 

Clypeasteroida